The 1997 Nordic Figure Skating Championships were held from February 21st through 23rd, 1997 in Hvidovre, Denmark. The competition was open to elite figure skaters from Nordic countries. Skaters competed in two disciplines, men's singles and ladies' singles, across two levels: senior (Olympic-level) and junior.

Senior results

Men

Ladies

Junior results

Men

Ladies

References

Nordic Figure Skating Championships, 1997
Nordic Figure Skating Championships, 1997
Nordic Figure Skating Championships
International figure skating competitions hosted by Denmark
Hvidovre Municipality
International sports competitions in Copenhagen